The Best Loser System refers to the method used in Mauritius since the 1950s to guarantee ethnic representation across the entire electorate in the National Assembly (Mauritius) without organising the representation wholly by ethnicity.

Methodology

The island's Constitution provides for 8 additional seats (often called "Best Loser" or "Correctional" seats) to prevent under-representation of minority ethnic groups. The methodology is applied by the Office of the Electoral Commission after the proclamation of detailed results of each General Elections. The main steps are described as follows: 

1. Based on the ethnic composition of the island dating back to the 1972 census the representation of 4 ethnic communities is compared to the ethnic composition of the elected members. Thus for each community the 1972 community size figure is divided by the number of seats won in the actual election by candidates of that particular community.

2. The most underrepresented ethnic community gets 1 of the first 4 additional seats. This is allocated to the best unsuccessful candidate of that community, irrespective of party affiliations.

3. The same formula is applied 3 additional times, each time the (new) level of under-representation of the ethnic communities is re-calculated. If a community runs out of candidates, the seat is not given to another community, but is kept for later allocation.

4. The Electoral Commissioner determines how many of the first 4 seats have not been given to the political party with the highest number of seats obtained in all 21 constituencies. A corresponding number of seats is then allocated to candidates of that party who belong to the most under-represented ethnic community.

2019 Best Losers
Following the November 2019 General Elections the Electoral Commissioner (Irfan Rahman) published the list of Best Losers which consisted of the following: 

1. Richard Duval (Alliance Nationale PTr-PMSD) 

2. Eshan Juman (Alliance Nationale PTr-PMSD)

3. Stephan Toussaint (Alliance Morisien MSM-ML)

4. Stéphanie Anquetil (Alliance Nationale PTr-PMSD)

5. Fazila Jeewa Daureeawoo (Alliance Morisien MSM-ML) 

6. Tania Diolle (Alliance Morisien MSM-ML) 

7. Anwar Husnoo (Alliance Morisien MSM-ML) 

8. Marie Arianne Navarre-Marie (MMM)

2014 Best Losers
There were 7 Best Losers who were nominated as a result of the December 2014 General Elections. These seats were allocated by the Electoral Commissioner (Irfan Rahman) to the following candidates who had not been elected:

1. Alain Wong (Alliance Lepep MSM-PMSD-ML) 

2. Thierry Henry (Alliance Lepep MSM-PMSD-ML) 

3. Raffick Sorefan (Alliance de l'unité et de la modernité PTr-MMM) 

4. Franco Quirin (Alliance de l'unité et de la modernité PTr-MMM) 

5. Guy Lepoigneur (Alliance Lepep MSM-PMSD-ML) 

6. Salim Abbas Mamode (Alliance Lepep MSM-PMSD-ML) 

7. Jean-Claude Barbier (Alliance de l'unité et de la modernité PTr-MMM)

2010 Best Losers
Following the 2010 General Elections the Labour-MSM-PMSD coalition came to power and the Electoral Commission nominated 7 Best Losers who had not been elected:

1. Stéphanie Anquetil (PTr-MSM-PMSD)

2. Francisco François (OPR)

3. Josique Radegonde (MMM) 

4. Raffick Sorefan (MMM) 

5. Michael Sik Yuen (PTr-PMSD-MSM)

6. Reza Issack (PTr-PMSD-MSM)

7. Aurore Perraud (PTr-PMSD-MSM)

2005 Best Losers
8 Best Losers were nominated to the National Assembly by the Electoral Commissioner following the 2005 General Elections as the Labour-PMSD coalition headed the new government:
 
1. James Burty David (PTr-PMSD)

2. Christian Léopold (MR)

3. Nicholas Von-Mally (MR)

4. Etienne Sinatambou (PTr-PMSD)

5. Cader SayedHossen (PTr-PMSD)

6. Jean-François Chaumière (PTr-PMSD) 

7. Dany Perrier (MSM-MMM)

8. Showkutally Soodhun (MSM-MMM)

2000 Best Losers
8 Best Losers were nominated by the Electoral Commission after the victory of the MSM-MMM coalition. 2 of these nominations were Hindus but from minority Telugu and Tamil communities:
 
1. Nicholas Von Mally (Mouvement Rodriguais)

2. James Burty David (PTrPMSD)

3. Ahmad Jeewa (MMM)

4. Christian Léopold (MR)

5. Anwar Omar (MSM-MMM)

6. Motee Ramdass (MSM-MMM)

7. Ravi Yerrigadoo (MSM-MMM) 

8. Xavier-Luc Duval (PTr-PMSD)

1995 Best Losers
Only 4 Best Losers were nominated after the 1995 General Elections when the Labour-MMM coalition came to power:
  
1. Gaëtan Duval (Parti Gaëtan Duval)

2. Nicholas VonMally (Mouvement Rodriguais)

3. Imam Mustapha Beeharry (Mouvement Islamiste)

4. Alex Nancy (Mouvement Rodriguais)

1991 Best Losers
There were 4 Best Losers who were nominated after the 1991 General Elections as the MSM-MMM coalition came to power:
 
1. Razack Peeroo (PTr-PMSD)

2. Gaëtan Duval (PTr-PMSD)

3. Siddick Chady (PTr-PMSD)

4. Clarel Malherbe (PTr-PMSD)

1987 Best Losers
There were 8 Best Losers who were nominated after the 1987 General Elections:
  
1. Sahid Maudarbocus (MMM)

2. Swalay Kasenally (MMM)

3. Germain Comarmond (MSM-PTr)

4. Karl Offmann (MSM-PTr)

5. Showkutally Soodhun (MSM-PTr)

6. Alain Laridon (MSM-PTr)

7. Régis Finette (MSM and PMSD)

8. Zeel Peerun (MMM)

1983 Best Losers
There were 8 Best Losers who were nominated after the 1983 General Elections:
  
1. Paul Bérenger (MMM) 

2. Joceline Minerve (MMM)

3. France Canabady (MMM)

4. Ghislaine Henry (PMSD)

5. Kamil Ramoly (PMSD)

6. Sylvio Michel (MSM-PTr)

7. Ismaël Nawoor (MSM-PTr)

8. Georgy Candahoo (MSM-PTr)

1982 Best Losers
There were 4 Best Losers were eventually nominated to the Legislative Assembly by the Electoral Commission although victorious party MMM had seriously considered the abolition of the Best Loser system:
 
1. Gaëtan Duval (PMSD)  

2. Nicol François (PMSD)

3. Marie-France Roussety (PTr-PMSD)  

4. Michael Glover (PTr-PMSD)

1976 Best Losers
Following the 1976 General Elections the Best Losers included the following candidates who had not been elected:

1. Yousuf Mohamed

2. Harold Walter

References

Politics of Mauritius